This is a list of Etchells sailboat championships.

References

Etchells
World championships in sailing